Folk rock group Fairport Convention is usually credited as the first British folk rock band. Founded in 1967 and initially covering songs by artists such as Bob Dylan and Joni Mitchell, they developed a devoted niche following by providing electrified and upbeat versions of traditional folk tunes alongside their own compositions. In a career spanning over 50 years, notable for numerous changes of line-up as well as continued success, Fairport Convention have issued over 50 albums.

Albums

Studio albums

Live albums

Compilation albums

Singles (UK issues)
"If I Had a Ribbon Bow"/"If (Stomp)" – February 1968, (Track)
"Meet on the Ledge"/"Throwaway Street Puzzle" – December 1968, (Island). Chart: #52
"I'll Keep It with Mine"/"Fotheringay" – 1969, (A&M) 
"Si Tu Dois Partir"/"Genesis Hall" – July 1969, (Island, UK; A&M, US) Chart: #21
"If (Stomp)"/"Chelsea Morning" – April 1970, (Polydor)
"Now Be Thankful"/"Sir B. McKenzie's Daughter's Lament..." – September 1970 (Island)
"Walk Awhile"/"Sir Patrick Spens" – 1970, (Série Parade: France)
"Sickness & Diseases"/"Wizard Of Worldly Game" – 1971 
"John Lee"/"The Time Is Near" – February 1972 (Island)
"The World Has Surely Lost Its Head"/"The Journeyman's Grace" – February 1972 (A&M, US)
"Rosie"/"Knights of the Road" – February 1973, (Island)
"Rosie"/"Fiddlestix" – May 1973 (Island)
"The Devil In The Kitchen"/"Possibly Parsons Green" – January 1974  (Island: Australia / New Zealand only)
"White Dress"/"Tears" – 1975, (Island)
"Si Tu Dois Partir"/"White Dress" – August 1975 (Série Parade: France)
"Jams O'Donnell's Jig"/"The Last Waltz" – June 1978 
"Rubber Band"/"The Bonny Black Hare" – March 1980, (Simons Records)
"Quazi-Be-Goode"/"Where Would You Rather Be Tonight?" – August 1986 (Sunrise)
"Meet on the Ledge"/"Sigh Beg Sigh Mor" – May 1987 (Island)

Notes

References

External links
Richard Thompson Site
Sandy Denny singles

Online Discography
[ Allmusic Discography]

Discographies of British artists
Folk music discographies